NGC 6027e is a tidal tail of NGC 6027, not an individual galaxy, that is part of Seyfert's Sextet, a compact group of galaxies, which is located in the constellation Serpens.

See also
 NGC 6027
 NGC 6027a
 NGC 6027b
 NGC 6027c
 NGC 6027d

References

External links
 HubbleSite NewsCenter: Pictures and description

Serpens (constellation)
Barred spiral galaxies
6027e
56579
10116 NED06